Tajikistan competed in the Summer Olympic Games as an independent nation for the first time at the 1996 Summer Olympics in Atlanta, United States.   Previously, Tajik athletes competed for the Unified Team at the 1992 Summer Olympics.

Athletics

Women
Track

Boxing

Diving

Men

Women

Judo

Wrestling

Greco–Roman

References
Official Olympic Reports

Nations at the 1996 Summer Olympics
1996
1996 in Tajikistani sport